Nazareno is a Brazilian municipality.

 Nazareno, Salta, a village and rural municipality in Argentina
 Nazarenos, (7–2 BC to AD 30–33), Jesus of Nazareth or Jesus Christ

See also
 Jesús Nazareno District, Peru
 Hospital de Jesús Nazareno, Mexico
 Nazarene (disambiguation)
 Nazarus (disambiguation)
 Nazareth (disambiguation)